This is a list of notable people born in, residents of, or otherwise closely associated with the city of Springfield, Missouri and its surrounding metropolitan area.

Politics
 John Ashcroft, former United States attorney general
 Matt Blunt, former governor of Missouri
 Melanie Blunt, former first lady of Missouri
 Roy Blunt, former U.S. senator
 Dennis Bonner, Missouri state legislator
 Sempronius H. Boyd, former U.S. representative and minister of the United States to Siam
 Miller Dunckel, former Michigan State Treasurer
 James McBride, former minister of the United States to Hawaii
 Karen L. Williams, current United States Ambassador to Suriname
 Charlie Brown, former U.S. representative
 Mark A. Ediger, former Surgeon General of the United States Air Force
 Johnny Ellis, Alaska state legislator
 Scott Fitzpatrick, State Auditor of Missouri and former State Treasurer of Missouri
 M. Douglas Harpool, United States District Judge
 Gilbert H. Jertberg, United States Circuit Judge
 Jim Keet (born 1949), former member of both houses of the Arkansas legislature; the 2010 Republican gubernatorial nominee in Arkansas
 Margaret Kelly, former Missouri state auditor, Missouri republican gubernatorial nominee
 Billy Long, former U.S. representative
 Dale Long, MLB baseball player, hit a home run in eight consecutive games
 Duard Marshall, painter, lithographer, and student of Thomas Hart Benton
 Roscoe C. Patterson, former U.S. senator and representative
 William C. Price, former Treasurer of the United States
 Crystal Quade, minority leader, Missouri House of Representatives
 Betsy Fogle, member of the Missouri House of Representatives
 Alex Riley, member of the Missouri House of Representatives

Arts, literature, humanities and entertainment
 Lennie Aleshire, vaudeville and country music performer
 Jerry L. Atwood, chemist
 Bob Barker, game show host (The Price is Right)
 Julie Blackmon, photographer
 Aaron Buerge, star of ABC's The Bachelor, season 2
Kristi Capel Miss Missouri 2006, anchor for WJW in Cleveland
 Kim Crosby, Broadway performer
 Ian Eskelin, lead singer of All Star United
 Ralph D. Foster, broadcasting pioneer
 William Garwood, actor
 John Goodman, actor (born in Affton and attended Missouri State University)
 Lucas Grabeel, actor, singer (High School Musical, High School Musical 2, and High School Musical 3: Senior Year)
 Sara Groves, Christian contemporary recording artist
 Tess Harper, actress (graduated from Missouri State University)
 David L. Harrison, children's author and poet
 Speedy Haworth, guitarist and singer
 Grace Hayes, actress
 Joe Haymes, swing era bandleader-arranger (born in Marshfield; grew up and began his band in Springfield)
 Josh Heinrichs, reggae singer
 Juto, singer
 Melissa Hutchison, two time BAFTA nominee
 Virginia Hunter, actress
 Jay Kenneth Johnson, actor (Days of Our Lives)
 The Jordanaires, singing group
 David Kershenbaum, record producer
 King's X, musical group
 Chandler Lawson, beauty pageant titleholder, Miss Tennessee 2012
 Brenda Lee, singer (moved to Springfield in 1956 at age 11)
 Jim Lowe, country music singer
 Robin Luke, musician
 The Marksmen, singing quartet (originally The Foggy River Boys)
 Mariann Mayberry, actress
 Crystal Methyd, drag queen, runner-up on season twelve of RuPaul's Drag Race
 Daya Betty, drag queen, contestant on season fourteen of RuPaul's Drag Race
Chappell Roan, singer-songwriter
 The Ozark Mountain Daredevils, musical group
 The Philharmonics, singing quintet
 Brad Pitt, actor,
 Mary Ellen Ray, actress 
 Jake Wesley Rogers, singer 
 Artie Romero, cartoonist, animator 
 Jah Roots, reggae band
 Ronnie Self, singer/songwriter
 Scott Siman, music producer and executive
 Si Siman, music producer and broadcast executive
 Cailee Spaeny, actress (Vice, On the Basis of Sex)
 Speakeasy, rock and roll band
 Someone Still Loves You Boris Yeltsin, musical group
 Heidi Strobel, Survivor contestant
 Terre Thaemlitz, musician, cultural producer
Marissa Whitley, Miss Teen USA 2001
 Tony Tost, poet
 Kathleen Turner, actress, two time Golden Globe Award winner
 Speedy West, steel guitarist and record producer
 Robert Westenberg, Broadway performer
 Tom Whitlock, Academy Award winner for Best Original Song, Take My Breath Away
 Adrienne Wilkinson, actress (graduated from Kickapoo High School)
 Slim Wilson, musician, radio and TV personality
 Daniel Woodrell, author
Percy Grainger, music composer, (lived in Springfield from 1940 to 1943)

Sports

 Jaelon Acklin, CFL player, Ottawa Redblacks
 Scott Bailes, MLB pitcher in 1980s and 1990s; color commentator for Springfield Cardinals
 Eddie Carnett, MLB pitcher in 1940s
 Dean Deetz, MLB player, Houston Astros
 Lori Endicott, Atlanta 1996 Olympic volleyball player
 BJ Flores, boxer
 Courtney Frerichs, Rio 2016 and Tokyo 2020 track and field
 Gracie Gold, Sochi 2014 Olympic figure skater, 2014 and 2016 U.S. champion
 Dorial Green-Beckham, NFL player, 2015 Tennessee Titans, 2016 Philadelphia Eagles
 Lucas Harrell, MLB player, Toronto Blue Jays
 John Howard, Mexico City 1968, Munich 1972, Montreal 1976 cycalist
 Ryan Howard, MLB player, 2005 NL Rookie of the Year, 2006 Home Run Derby champion, 2006 NL Most Valuable Player
 Jack Jewsbury, MLS player for Portland Timbers
 Jerry Jones, Dallas Cowboys owner; worked in Springfield with father Pat Jones at insurance company Modern Security Life in 1960s
 Josh Kinney, first Springfield Cardinal (AA) to make MLB St. Louis Cardinals roster
 Stan Musial, Hall of Fame baseball player for St. Louis Cardinals, played for original Springfield Cardinals in late 1930s
 Larry Nemmers, NFL referee
 Mickey Owen, MLB player
 Robin Partch, Grenoble 1968 luger
 Dave Patterson, MLB player, Los Angeles Dodgers
 Jason Pyrah, Atlanta 1996 and Sydney 2000 Olympic 1500m runner
 Steve Rogers, MLB starting pitcher, 5-time All-Star; most successful pitcher in Montreal Expos history
 Emily Scott, Sochi 2014 Olympic speed skater
 Horton Smith, golfer, two-time Masters Tournament champion
 Payne Stewart, professional golfer
 Jackie Stiles, NCAA all-time leading scorer in women's basketball
 Jeri Sitzes, boxer
 Anthony Tolliver, NBA player for Minnesota Timberwolves
 Paul Walker, football player

Business
 William F. Austin, CEO of Starkey Hearing Technologies
 Jack Gentry, World War II and Korean War veteran; founder of Positronic
 David Glass, former CEO of Walmart; owner of MLB's Kansas City Royals
 John Morris, founder and majority owner, Bass Pro Shops
 Jack Stack, founder of SRC Holdings
 Byron Trott, investment banker

Other
 Jimmie Angel, aviator, discoverer of Angel Falls, highest free-falling waterfall in world
 Oliver Brown, plaintiff in the Supreme Court case Brown v. Board of Education, born in Springfield
 James E. Cofer, professor at Missouri State University, president 2010-11
 J. Alan Groves, Biblical Hebrew scholar; editor of Groves-Wheeler Hebrew morphology database
 Edwin P. Hubble, of Hubble Space Telescope fame (born in Marshfield)
 Virginia E. Johnson, sexologist; junior member of Masters and Johnson sexuality research team
 Janet Kavandi, NASA astronaut
 Curtis Price KBE, warden of New College, Oxford
 Emma J. Ray, activist, suffragist

Notes 

Springfield